Emarginea percara, the beloved emarginea moth, is a moth in the family Noctuidae (the owlet moths). The genus was erected by Herbert Knowles Morrison in 1875.

The MONA or Hodges number for Emarginea percara is 9718.

References

Further reading

External links
 

Amphipyrinae
Articles created by Qbugbot
Moths described in 1875